Casasco d'Intelvi was a comune (municipality) in the Province of Como in the Italian region Lombardy, located about  north of Milan and about  north of Como, on the border with Switzerland.   On 1 January 2018 it was merged with San Fedele Intelvi and Castiglione d'Intelvi to form the new comune of Centro Valle Intelvi.

Cities and towns in Lombardy